The 1979 Connecticut Huskies football team represented the University of Connecticut in the 1979 NCAA Division I-AA football season.  The Huskies were led by third year head coach Walt Nadzak, and completed the season with a record of 3–6–2.

Schedule

References

Connecticut
UConn Huskies football seasons
Connecticut Huskies football